Donald George Marion (July 31, 1889 – January 18, 1933) was a pitcher in Major League Baseball in 1914 and 1915.

Sources

1889 births
1933 deaths
Major League Baseball pitchers
Brooklyn Tip-Tops players
Baseball players from Ohio
People from Bowling Green, Ohio
Duluth White Sox players
Milwaukee Brewers (minor league) players
Wilkes-Barre Barons (baseball) players
Bloomington Bloomers players
Vernon Tigers players